Sir Robert Loder, 1st Baronet, DL, JP (7 August 1823 – May 1888) was an English landowner, magistrate and Conservative politician.

Biography

Early life
Robert Loder was born on 7 August 1823 in Saint Petersburg, Russia. His father was Giles Loder (1786–1871) of Wilsford near Salisbury in Wiltshire, and his mother, Elizabeth Higgbotham (unknown-1848), daughter of John Higgbotham, of Saint Petersburg. He was educated at Emmanuel College, Cambridge.

Inheritance
He inherited a considerable fortune from his father and had extensive estates in Northamptonshire and Sussex as well as in Russia and Sweden.

Career
He was a Justice of the Peace and Deputy Lieutenant for Sussex and a JP for Northamptonshire. In 1877, he served as the High Sheriff of Sussex.

At the 1880 general election, he was elected Member of Parliament for New Shoreham. He held the seat until 1885. In 1887 Loder was created a Baronet, of Whittlebury in the County of Northampton, and of High Beeches in Slaugham in the County of Sussex.

Personal life
He married Maria Georgiana Busk (1826–1907), fourth daughter of Hans Busk (1772–1862), a Welsh poet. Sir Robert and Lady Loder  had ten children:
 Sir Edmund Giles Loder, 2nd Baronet (1849–1920). He married Marion Hubbard. They had had two children:
 Patience Marion Loder (1882–1963). She married Walter William Otter (1879-1940).
 Robert Egerton Loder (1887–1917). He married Muriel Rolls Hoare (1879–1955). They had one son: 
 Sir Giles Rolls Loder, 3rd Baronet (1914–1999). He married Marie Violet Pamela Symons-Jeune (unknown-2005). They had two sons:
 Sir Edmund Jeune Loder, 4th Baronet (born 1941).
 Robert Reginald Loder (born 1943).
 Wilfrid Hans Loder (1851–1902).
 Etheldreda Mary Loder (1853–1921). She married Sir Charles Raymond Burrell, 6th Baronet on 22 July 1872
 Lt.-Col. Alfred Basil Loder (1855–1905).
 Clare Robert Loder (1857–1857).
 Adela Maria Loder (1859–1915).
 Gerald Loder, 1st Baron Wakehurst (1861–1936). He  married Lady Louise de Vere Beauclerk, eldest daughter of William Beauclerk, 10th Duke of St Albans, in 1890.
 Reginald Bernhard Loder (1864–1931).
 Sydney Loder (1867–1944).
 Major Eustace Loder(1867–1914).

Sir Robert and Lady Loder had a number of homes, including  Beach House in Worthing, West Sussex where Sir Robert  died in May 1888, at the age of sixty-four, and was buried in the churchyard of Whittlebury, where he had restored the church.

Family inter-marriage
On 2 March 1905,  "The Dowager Lady Loder"  was  a guest at the wedding of her granddaughter, Miss Mary Emma Burrell, daughter of the Sir Charles Raymond Burrell, 6th Baronet to Alan Cecil Lupton, a grandson of Lady Loder's  first cousin, Anna Jane Lupton (née Busk, 1813–1888). Mr and Mrs Alan Cecil Lupton were  third cousins, both being descended from Sir Wadsworth Busk, Sir Robert Loder's grandfather-in-law. Lady Loder  died 15 November 1907.

References

1823 births
1888 deaths
Conservative Party (UK) MPs for English constituencies
UK MPs 1880–1885
Alumni of Emmanuel College, Cambridge
Deputy Lieutenants of Sussex
High Sheriffs of Sussex
Baronets in the Baronetage of the United Kingdom